Billy Miller  (born 21 February 1988, Brisbane) is an Australian water polo player. At the 2012 Summer Olympics, he competed for the Australia men's national water polo team in the men's event.

His brother was Cole Miller, who was also a water polo player for Brisbane Barracudas, before being killed in a king hit attack on Brisbane Chinatown Mall on January 4, 2016.

References

External links
 

1988 births
Living people
People from Brisbane
Australian male water polo players
Olympic water polo players of Australia
Water polo players at the 2012 Summer Olympics